Willard Park may refer to:

Willard Zerbe Park (1906–1965), American anthropologist and Soviet agent
Willard Park (Cleveland park), a park in downtown Cleveland, Ohio, USA